Charles Whitehead (1804 – 5 July 1862) was an English poet, novelist and dramatist.

Whitehead was born in London, the eldest son of a wine merchant. His most popular works were: The Solitary (1831), a poem, The Autobiography of Jack Ketch (1834), a novel, The Cavalier (1836), a play in blank verse, Richard Savage (1842), perhaps his finest novel; and The Earl of Essex, an historical romance (1843).

Whitehead recommended Charles Dickens for the writing of the letterpress for Robert Seymour's drawings, which ultimately developed into The Pickwick Papers.

Whitehead had problems with alcohol and decided to travel to Melbourne, Australia, hoping for fresh start, arriving in 1857. He already was acquainted with Richard Henry Horne, he befriended James Smith and James Neild and wrote a little for the local press. He applied for admission to the Melbourne Benevolent Asylum in February 1862 in vain; a few months later he was picked up exhausted in a street and taken to the Melbourne hospital, where he died on 5 July 1862 of hepatitis and bronchitis and was buried in a pauper's grave.

Mackenzie Bell wrote a tribute to Whitehead, published in 1884 by T. F. Unwin, and also in the same year by Elliot Stock, Forgotten Genius. Charles Whitehead, a critical monograph, then a new edition, with added material and an appreciation by Hall Caine, Charles Whitehead: a Forgotten Genius (1894), published by Ward, Lock & Co.

Notes

References

Clive Turnbull, 'Whitehead, Charles (1804–1862)', Australian Dictionary of Biography, Volume 6, MIP, 1976, pp 391–392. Accessed 31 December 2012

Additional resources listed by the Australian Dictionary of Biography:
H. T. M. Bell, A Forgotten Genius; Charles Whitehead (Lond, 1894)
J. Forster, The Life of Charles Dickens, J. W. T. Ley ed (Lond, 1928)
C. Turnbull, Australian Lives (Melb, 1965)My Note Book, vol 3 (1858)Examiner (Melbourne), 23 August 1862Australasian'', 17 November 1866, 24 September & 18 May 1889, 28 July 1894.

1804 births
1862 deaths
English male poets
Writers from London
English male novelists
19th-century English poets
19th-century English novelists
19th-century English male writers